Herbert Barker may refer to:

 Herbert Atkinson Barker (1869–1950), English manipulative surgeon
 Herbert Barker (golfer) (1883–1924), English golfer and golf course architect